Northville Historic District is a national historic district located in the village of Northville in Fulton County, New York.  The district is "L"-shaped, beginning at the southern end of South Main Street and running north to Bridge and Division Street.  It continues west along those streets to the western end of the peninsula on which Northville is located.

The district includes 176 contributing buildings and 1 contributing site in the central business district and surround residential sections of Northville.  The district developed between about 1819 and 1933, and includes representative examples of a variety of popular architectural styles.  Notable buildings include the Ray Hubbell House (c. 1880), St. Francis Assisi Catholic Church (1896, 1922), Chequer & Kested Blacksmith Shop (c. 1870), Mosher Brothers Store (1915), Baptist Church (1903), Yates House (c. 1840), First United Methodist Church (1871), Hubbell Factory Store & Shed (c. 1910), and Star Theatre (c. 1850-70).

It was added to the National Register of Historic Places in 2014.

References

External links

Draft NPS Nomination
Walking Tour

Historic districts on the National Register of Historic Places in New York (state)
Historic districts in Fulton County, New York
National Register of Historic Places in Fulton County, New York